Hanover Township is one of 29 townships in Cook County, Illinois, USA and is located at the end of the county's panhandle. As of the 2010 census, its population was 99,538.
Hanover Township was established on April 2, 1850. The first reported population of the Township was 672. The Township gets its name from the "Kingdom of Hanover in Western Germany," which is where a majority of the Township's first residents originated from.

The primary governmental concerns were collecting taxes, control and collection of stray animals and maintenance of the roads. "Poor relief" was minimal in the early days of the Township and the Clerk was in control of organizing the machinery for elections, similar to the job they do today.

Today, Hanover Township has a population of over 100,000 residents. Most of Streamwood lies within the boundaries of the Township, along with portions of Bartlett, Elgin, Hanover Park, Hoffman Estates, Schaumburg and unincorporated Cook County. Township offices are set throughout the Township with the Township Town Hall at 250 S. IL Route 59 in Bartlett, the Senior Center at 240 S. IL Route 59 in Bartlett, the Astor Avenue Community Center at 7431 Astor Avenue in Hanover Park, the Community Resource Center at 1535 Burgundy Place in Streamwood and the Izaak Walton Center at 899 Jay Street in Elgin.

Current elected officials
The current township officials are:
 Brian P. McGuire, Supervisor
 Katy Dolan Baumer, Clerk
 Thomas S. Smogolski, Assessor
 Mary Alice Benoit, Trustee
 Craig Essick, Trustee
 Khaja Moinuddin, Trustee 
 Eugene N. Martinez, Trustee

Heritage Marker Program
The Hanover Township Heritage Marker Program began in April 2011 to recognize and promote the many historic locations in Hanover Township. Currently there are five Heritage Markers around the Township, including: Ahlstrand Park in Hanover Park, Immanuel United Church of Christ Cemetery in Streamwood, Hoosier Grove Schoolhouse in Streamwood, Lords Park in Elgin and Leatherman Homestead in Bartlett.

Geography

Demographics

According to the Census Reporter Hanover Township's Demographics are listed below.
Total Population: 100,603Male: 51%    Female: 49%White: 45%    African American: 4%    Asian: 13%Hispanic: 36%    Two or more races: 1%Median Age Range: 34.7 yearsAge 0-18: 28%Age 19-64: 65%Age 65 and above: 7%Median Household Income: $74,546
Per Capita Income: $29,444

Cities, towns, villages
 Bartlett (northern half)
 Elgin (small portion)
 Hanover Park (mostly)
 Hoffman Estates (mostly)
 Schaumburg (west edge)
 South Barrington (south edge)
 Streamwood

Unincorporated towns
Spaulding at

Adjacent townships
 Barrington Township (north)
 Schaumburg Township (east)
 Bloomingdale Township, DuPage County (southeast)
 Wayne Township, DuPage County (south)
 St. Charles Township, Kane County (southwest)
 Elgin Township, Kane County (west)
 Dundee Township, Kane County (northwest)

Cemeteries
The township contains these four cemeteries: Bartlett, Bluff City, Lake Street Memorial Park and Mount Hope. Hoosier Grove cemetery behind Immanuel United Church of Christ on Old Church Road in Streamwood is closed for in-ground burials, but does have columbarium niches available through the church.

Major highways
  Interstate 90
  U.S. Route 20
  Illinois Route 19
  Illinois Route 25 (grazes the northwest corner)
  Illinois Route 58
  Illinois Route 59
  Illinois Route 72

Airports and landing strips
 Urso Heliport

Lakes
 Back Lake
 Front Lake
 Island Lake

Political districts
 Illinois's 6th congressional district
 State House District 43
 State House District 44
 State House District 55
 State Senate District 22
 State Senate District 28

References
 
 United States Census Bureau 2007 TIGER/Line Shapefiles
 United States National Atlas

External links
 Hanover Township official website
 History of Hanover
 City-Data.com
 Illinois State Archives
 Township Officials of Illinois
 Cook County official site

Townships in Cook County, Illinois
Townships in Illinois
1850 establishments in Illinois